Marcel Mazeyrat (7 October 1906 – 7 March 1980) was a French racing cyclist. He rode in the 1929 Tour de France.

References

1906 births
1980 deaths
French male cyclists
Place of birth missing